1913 in sports describes the year's events in world sport.

American football
College championship
 College football national championship – Harvard Crimson

Association football
England
 The Football League – Sunderland 54 points, Aston Villa 50, The Wednesday 49, Manchester United 46, Blackburn Rovers 45, Manchester City 44
 FA Cup final – Aston Villa 1–0 Sunderland at Crystal Palace, London
 Woolwich Arsenal, which has just been relegated to Division Two, moves across London from Manor Ground, Plumstead to the new Arsenal Stadium at Highbury in Islington.  Soon afterwards, the club drops "Woolwich" from its name to be known as Arsenal F.C..
Germany
 National Championship – VfB Leipzig 3–1 Duisburger SpV at München-Sendling
Netherlands
 PSV Eindhoven founded in Eindhoven.
Scotland
 Scottish Football League – Rangers
 Scottish Cup – Falkirk 2–0 Raith Rovers
United States
 United States Soccer Federation is formed.

Australian rules football
VFL Premiership
 Fitzroy wins the 17th VFL Premiership: Fitzroy 7.14 (56) d St Kilda 4.9 (33) at Melbourne Cricket Ground (MCG)

Bandy
International
 Inaugural European Championship is held in Davos, Switzerland, and is won by England
Sweden
 Championship final – IFK Uppsala 2–1 AIK

Baseball
World Series
 7–11 October — Philadelphia Athletics (AL) defeats New York Giants (NL) to win the 1913 World Series by 4 games to 1.  That is three wins in four years for the Athletics under Connie Mack, three losses in three years for the Giants under John McGraw.
Events
 The Brooklyn Dodgers move into their new stadium, Ebbets Field.

Boxing
Events
 14 May — Jack Johnson is convicted in Chicago of violating the 1910 Mann Act and is subsequently sentenced to a term of imprisonment of one year and one day plus a fine of $1,000. In June, while still free with an appeal pending, Johnson flees the United States and does not return until July 1920.  Johnson is the first person to be prosecuted under the Act, which prohibits so-called white slavery including the interstate transport of females for "immoral purposes". Johnson has had affairs with white prostitutes who have travelled with him to other states.  In Johnson's case, it is held that the authorities are using the Act's ambiguous language to justify a selective prosecution which amounts to harassment, based on their desire to deprive him of his title for racist reasons.  Johnson retains the title for another two years.
 Following victories in France against Georges Carpentier and Billy Papke, German-American boxer Frank Klaus re-establishes the lineage of the World Middleweight Championship, broken since the death of Stanley Ketchel in 1910.  
 11 October — Klaus is himself beaten by George Chip with a 6th-round knockout at Pittsburgh.  Chip holds the middleweight title until 1914.   
Lineal world champions
 World Heavyweight Championship – Jack Johnson
 World Light Heavyweight Championship – vacant
 World Middleweight Championship – vacant → Frank Klaus → George Chip
 World Welterweight Championship – vacant
 World Lightweight Championship – Willie Ritchie
 World Featherweight Championship – Johnny Kilbane
 World Bantamweight Championship – Johnny Coulon

Canadian football
Grey Cup
 29 November — 5th Grey Cup – Hamilton Tigers 44–2 Toronto Parkdale Canoe Club

Cricket
England
 County Championship – Kent 
 Minor Counties Championship – Norfolk
 Most runs – Phil Mead 2627 @ 50.51 (HS 171*) 
 Most wickets – Major Booth 181 @ 18.46 (BB 8–86)
 Wisden Cricketers of the Year – Major Booth, George Gunn, Bill Hitch, Albert Relf, Lionel Tennyson 
Australia
 Sheffield Shield – South Australia
 Most runs – Victor Trumper 843 @ 84.30 (HS 201*)
 Most wickets – Jack Massie 59 @ 18.66 (BB 7–110) 
India
 Bombay Quadrangular – Parsees
New Zealand
 Plunket Shield – Canterbury
South Africa
 Currie Cup – Natal 
West Indies
 Inter-Colonial Tournament – not contested

Cycling
Tour de France
 Philippe Thys (Belgium) wins the 11th Tour de France

Figure skating
World Figure Skating Championships
 World Men's Champion – Fritz Kachler (Austria)
 World Women's Champion – Opika von Méray Horváth (Hungary)
 World Pairs Champions – Helene Engelmann / Karl Mejstrik (Austria)

Golf
Major tournaments
 British Open – John Henry Taylor
 US Open – Francis Ouimet is the first amateur to win the US Open in a surprise playoff victory over Harry Vardon and Ted Ray
Other tournaments
 British Amateur – Harold Hilton
 US Amateur – Jerome Travers

Horse racing
England
 Grand National – Covertcoat
 1,000 Guineas Stakes – Jest
 2,000 Guineas Stakes – Louvois
 The Derby – Aboyeur
 The Oaks – Jest
 St. Leger Stakes – Night Hawk
Australia
 Melbourne Cup – Posinatus
Canada
 King's Plate – Hearts of Oak
Ireland
 Irish Grand National – Little Hack II (second win, having previously won in 1909)
 Irish Derby Stakes – Bachelor's Wedding
USA
 Kentucky Derby – Donerail 
 Preakness Stakes – Buskin
 Belmont Stakes – Prince Eugene

Ice hockey
Stanley Cup
 Quebec Bulldogs wins the National Hockey Association (NHA) championship and the Stanley Cup for both the second time and second year in succession.  Bulldogs then defeats Sydney Minors 2 games to 0 in a Stanley Cup challenge.
Events
 Winnipeg Hockey Club wins the Allan Cup
 Victoria Senators win the Pacific Coast Hockey Association championship before playing an exhibition series with the Bulldogs, which is won by the Aristocrats

Motorsport

Multi-sport events
Far Eastern Championship Games
 First Far Eastern Championship Games held in Manila, Philippines

Rowing
The Boat Race
 13 March — Oxford wins the 70th Oxford and Cambridge Boat Race

Rugby league
England
 Championship – Huddersfield
 Challenge Cup final – Huddersfield 9–5 Warrington at Headingley Rugby Stadium, Leeds 
 Lancashire League Championship – Wigan
 Yorkshire League Championship – Huddersfield
 Lancashire County Cup – Wigan 21–5 Rochdale Hornets 
 Yorkshire County Cup – Batley 17–3 Hull F.C.
Australia
 NSW Premiership – Eastern Suburbs (outright winner)

Rugby union
Five Nations Championship
 31st Five Nations Championship series is won by England who complete the Grand Slam

Speed skating
Speed Skating World Championships
 Men's All-round Champion – Oscar Mathisen (Norway)

Tennis
Australia
 Australian Men's Singles Championship – Ernie Parker (Australia) defeats Harry Parker (Australia) 2–6 6–1 6–3 6–2 
England
 Wimbledon Men's Singles Championship – Anthony Wilding (New Zealand) defeats Maurice McLoughlin (USA) 8–6 6–3 10–8
 Wimbledon Women's Singles Championship – Dorothea Douglass Lambert Chambers (GB) defeats Winifred Slocock McNair (GB) 6–0 6–4 
France
 French Men's Singles Championship – Max Decugis (France) defeats Georges Gault (France): details unknown
 French Women's Singles Championship – Marguerite Broquedis (France) defeats Jeanne Matthey (France)
USA
 American Men's Singles Championship – Maurice McLoughlin (USA) defeats Richard Norris Williams (USA) 6–4 5–7 6–3 6–1
 American Women's Singles Championship – Mary Browne (USA) defeats Dorothy Green (USA) 6–2 7–5
Davis Cup
 1913 International Lawn Tennis Challenge –  3–2  at Worple Road (grass) London, United Kingdom

References

 
Sports by year